The Chyetverikov ARK-3 (ARKtichyeskii - arctic) was a multi-role flying boat designed for Arctic operations that was built in the Soviet Union from 1933. It featured a conventional flying boat hull, with high cantilever wings equipped with floats at mid-span. The two piston engines were mounted in tractor-pusher fashion on a pylon above the fuselage.

Development 
In 1933 Chyetverikov had the design for a compact twin engined flying-boat ready for further development, which he proposed to the Glavsyevmorput (Glavsyevmorput – chief administration of northern sea routes) as a multi-role Arctic aircraft, and an order for a prototype was made, setting up Chyetverikov in his own OKB (design bureau).

The dual control enclosed cockpit housed two pilots sided by side with two gunners/observers in bow and dorsal positions. Strut-supported wooden floats, at approximately half-span; and a pylon-supported engine nacelle housing tandem radial engines with Townend ring cowlings; completed the structural elements, built with a safety factor of 5.5.

Flight- and sea trials in 1936 revealed weaknesses in the bows, floats and engine nacelle pylon, which were all strengthened. A production order for five aircraft was placed, with production commencing immediately.

On 14 July 1937 the ARK-3-1 was destroyed following a structural failure; the ARK-3-2 was destroyed exactly one year later and the programme was cancelled.

Variants 
ARK-3-1The first prototype ARK-3 renamed after the second prototype was ordered
ARK-3-2The second prototype ARK-3 with more powerful engines, longer hull, increased wing chord and manual guns fitted in a manual gun turret in the bows and a dorsal sliding hatch.
ARK-3 MP2Designation of the five production aircraft and the initial designation of the first prototype.

Specifications (ARK-3-2)

References 

 Angelucci, Enzo. The Rand McNally Encyclopedia of Military Aircraft, 1914-1980. San Diego, California: The Military Press, 1983. Pg. 311 .
 Gunston, Bill. The Osprey Encyclopaedia of Russian Aircraft 1875 – 1995. London, Osprey. 1995. 
 Taylor, Michael J.H. . Jane's Encyclopedia of Aviation. Studio Editions. London. 1989.  

1930s Soviet patrol aircraft
Flying boats
Chyetverikov aircraft
Twin-engined push-pull aircraft
High-wing aircraft
Aircraft first flown in 1936